Jekyll & Hyde en Español is the Spanish version of the album of the same name released by legendary Christian rock band Petra. It was released in 2004 by Inpop Records.

The songs were translated by Alejandro Allen, who had worked translating Petra songs before when he worked in a Mexican production titled Colección Coral Petra II.

Track listing
 "Jekyll & Hyde" – 3:04
 "¿Quién es tu conécte alla?" – 2:35
 "Párate" – 3:19
 "Lo que pudo ser" – 2:58
 "Un mundo perfecto" – 3:13
 "La prueba" – 3:01
 "Te adoro" – 2:33
 "Así es nuestra vida" – 3:27
 "Moldéame" – 3:03
 "Pacto de amor" – 3:50

Personnel

 John Schlitt – lead vocals
 Bob Hartman – guitars
 Greg Bailey – backing vocals

Guest musicians
 Peter Furler – drums, background vocals, producer
 Pablo Olivares – background vocals

References 

2004 albums
Petra (band) albums
Inpop Records albums
Spanish-language albums
Works based on Strange Case of Dr Jekyll and Mr Hyde